Mansein may refer to several places in Burma:

Mansein (25°16"N 95°10"E) - Homalin Township, Sagaing Region
Mansein (25°12"N 95°57"E) - Homalin Township, Sagaing Region